Andrew 'Andy' P Moore is a former Wales international rugby union player. A lock forward, he played his club rugby for Swansea RFC, Bridgend RFC and Cardiff Blues and was in the Wales squad for the 1995 Rugby World Cup. Moore captained Wales on two occasions in 2001, winning both matches.

Playing career
Moore played football as a goalkeeper and was capped at Under 18 level at football after 3 years with Crewe Alexander FC Youth Centre of Excellence and trails at Manchester United. He switched to rugby and gained caps at Under 18, Youth, Under 19, Under 21, Wales A and was capped at the age of 21 for Wales against South Africa in 1995 in Johannesburg.
Moore signed professional contracts with Swansea RFC and the WRU in 1995, winning 4 league title and 2 National Cups with Swansea. In 2002 he moved to Bridgend RFC winning the league title before moving to the Cardiff Blues in 2003 captaining the side several times. His career was cut short at the age of 30 with a neck injury while at the Cardiff Blues in 2004.

After rugby
Moore ran a successful Property Investment Company from 2003. In 2006 he co-founded, developed and ran an award-winning Sales and Marketing Estate Agent specialising on the Overseas Property Market. In 2009 he joined a Swiss Holding Company listed on the Frankfurt Open Market, holding the position of Chief Operating Officer. After a year of restructuring and raising funds for development of the business he became Group CEO in 2010.
In 2011 after an inspiring cancer charity climb to the top of Kilimanjaro with 15 Ex Welsh Rugby Captains and Warren Gatland, Andy decided there was not enough being done to help elite athletes with their transition out of professional sport and in to new career. So together with his former international rugby player brother Steve Moore Founded Athlete Career Transition (ACT). Athlete Career Transition (ACT) was created through a combination of the career transition experiences of ACT's Founders,  Andy and his brother Steve Moore. ACT now has Sir Steve Redgrave as a shareholder and ambassador and they are the world leading private organisation in this space working with the best global athletes and businesses. In 2015 Andy and his brother Steve were listed in the GQ 100 Most Connected Men in Britain.

Personal life
Moore climbed Kilimanjaro in 2010 as part of the Captains Climb in aid of the Velindre Stepping Stones appeal for lung cancer which raised over £500,000. He is also raising money again for the charity on a sponsored bike ride in the US from Yosemite National Park to Golden Gate bridge in San Francisco in 2012 and  Boston to New York 2014. Moore now gives back to his local community by coaching at South Gower RFC and Swansea School Boys U11's representative teams.

References

1974 births
Living people
English rugby union players
Rugby union players from Grantham
Swansea RFC players
Wales international rugby union players
Wales rugby union captains
Welsh rugby union players
Rugby union locks